Larry J. Sanders (born December 2, 1960),  known professionally as L.V. (an acronym for "Large Variety"), is an American singer. He is best known for his collaboration with rapper Coolio on the single "Gangsta's Paradise", which has been featured on multiple soundtracks since then. He has released five solo albums and was a member of the gangsta rap group South Central Cartel since it formed, usually singing the choruses.

Discography

Studio albums

Collaboration albums
The Playground (with Prodeje) (2002)
Hood Affiliated (with Prodeje) (2008)

Compilation albums
The Gangstas In South Central (with South Central Cartel) (1996)

Singles

As featured artist

References 

Living people
Grammy Award winners
Singers from Los Angeles
Tommy Boy Records artists
American shooting survivors
African-American male rappers
American contemporary R&B singers
21st-century American rappers
21st-century American male musicians
1960 births
21st-century African-American musicians
20th-century African-American male singers